Pietro Di Nardo (born 8 February 1990) is a Swiss professional footballer who plays as a midfielder for the Swiss club Neuchâtel Xamax FCS.

Professional career
Di Nardo joined Neuchâtel Xamax on 7 June 2014, after a couple of years with FC Biel-Bienne and FC Thun in the Swiss Challenge League. On 29 March 2018 at the age of 28, Di Nardo signed his first professional contract after helping Xamax get promoted into the Swiss Super League. Di Nardo made his professional debut in a 2-0 Swiss Super League win over FC Luzern on 21 July 2018.

On 7 January 2020, Di Nardo moved to Yverdon-Sport FC. However, he was not used in any officiel games, as the club's president, Mario Di Pietrantonio, expressed, that he wasn't convinced by Di Nardo since his arrival. Therefore, he left the club at the end of the season.

International career
Di Nardo was born in Switzerland and is of Italian and Portuguese descents. He was a youth international for Switzerland.

Honours
 Swiss Challenge League (1): 2016-17
 Swiss Promotion League (1): 2014-15

References

External links
 
 Xamax profile
 SFL Profile

1990 births
Living people
People from Biel/Bienne
Swiss men's footballers
Switzerland youth international footballers
Swiss people of Italian descent
Neuchâtel Xamax FCS players
BSC Young Boys players
FC Biel-Bienne players
FC Thun players
Yverdon-Sport FC players
Swiss Challenge League players
Swiss Super League players
Association football midfielders
Sportspeople from the canton of Bern